The 2015 Israel Premier Lacrosse League season was the 1st and inaugural season of Israel Premier Lacrosse League.

Barak Netanya LC won the IPLL Championship with a win over Haifa LC, with Bryan Hopper winning the EL AL Player of the Game award. A total of 16 games were played, with each team playing eight games.

Standings

Results

Source:

Player award

Source:

First Team All-Israel

Source:

References

Lacrosse in Israel
Israel Premier Lacrosse
Israel